is a Japanese football player. He plays for Okinawa SV.

Club statistics
Updated to 23 February 2018.

References

External links
Profile at FC Ryukyu

1994 births
Living people
Osaka Sangyo University alumni
Association football people from Okinawa Prefecture
Japanese footballers
J3 League players
FC Ryukyu players
Okinawa SV players
Association football forwards